Linda rubescens is a species of beetle in the family Cerambycidae. It was described by Frederick William Hope in 1831. It is known from Nepal, Bhutan and India.

Subspecies
, only one subspecies is recognized aside from the nominotypical subspecies:

 Linda rubescens frontalis  (found in Tibet Autonomous Region)

References

rubescens
Beetles described in 1831
Taxa named by Frederick William Hope